Michael Anthony Woods is an English producer, DJ and remixer of various EDM genres, mainly progressive house, electro house and trance. He is the founder of the imprint label Diffused Music, which was established in 2010 and focuses primarily on progressive house and tech house. He has worked under the stage names of Out of Office, Warrior, Accadia, M1 and M3.

Biography
Initially known as Warrior, Michael Woods had his first hits in 2000 with the debut single "Warrior" and the follow-up "Voodoo". "Warrior" achieved a No. 1 ranking in the UK Club Chart, and also did well in the top 40, entering at No. 19. "Voodoo" also reached top 40. He also released ambient trance singles on Lost Language under the name Accadia.

Woods became widely known for the songs "If U Want Me" (2003), featuring Australian model Imogen Bailey, and "Solex (Close to the Edge)" (2003), featuring vocals by Juliette Jaimes, known best for her Holly Valance cover, "Kiss Kiss" (2002). Both of these singles also had an associated music video. They peaked on the UK Singles Chart at No. 46 and No. 52 respectively.

Michael Woods' sister, Marcella Woods, is also a singer, known for her co-operations with Matt Darey on "Beautiful", "Liberation" and "U Shine On". Her vocals also appear on "So Special" (2005), which was the result of co-operation between Michael Woods and Judge Jules. She has also joined Michael with Out of Office and released their second single, "Break of Dawn", to follow up the 2007 single, "Hands Up".

Michael produced the track "Changed the Way You Kiss Me" for singer & rapper Example which debuted at No.1 in the UK singles charts in June 2011.

Michael Woods is currently operating under the project name "Offaiah", which is a play on the words "All" and "Fire".

Discography

Singles

References

External links
Michael Woods official site
Out of Office official site

Living people
Year of birth missing (living people)
English electronic musicians
English house musicians
English DJs
English record producers
Electronic dance music DJs
Progressive house musicians
Place of birth missing (living people)
Remixers
Mau5trap artists